The Basilica of the Holy Sacrament is a Roman Catholic parish church in Colonia del Sacramento, Uruguay.

History

The parish was established on 2 February 1680, being one of the oldest in the country. The first church was a humble mud ranch. It is as old as the city itself (a former Portuguese settlement). The present church dates back to 1810, when it was built according to plans by Tomás Toribio; soon afterward a lightning storm destroyed the building, which was restored between 1836 and 1841. Finally, in 1976 a conceptual refurbishment took place. Architects José Terra Carve, Antonio Cravotto, and Miguel Ángel Odriozola worked on its restoration.

In 1995, the Historic Quarter of the City of Colonia del Sacramento was declared a World Heritage Site by UNESCO - with it, the Basilica.

References

External links

 Colonia del Sacramento 

Colonia del Sacramento
1680 establishments in Uruguay
Roman Catholic churches completed in 1810
Roman Catholic church buildings in Colonia Department
Portuguese colonial architecture in Uruguay
19th-century Roman Catholic church buildings in Uruguay